Scarlet Moon de Chevalier (12 September 1950 – 5 June 2013) was a Brazilian actress, journalist and writer who died of multiple system atrophy on 5 June 2013 at the age of 62.

References

2013 deaths
Brazilian actresses
1950 births
Actresses from Rio de Janeiro (city)
Neurological disease deaths in Rio de Janeiro (state)
Deaths from multiple system atrophy